The axe bass is a bass guitar which is visually designed in similarity to that of an axe. This design is (though rare) highly prized among bass players usually in hard rock and heavy metal music. Some electric guitars have also sported the axe design though they are moderately popular and sometimes discredited. Since its creation, the axe bass has been highly desired, very expensive, and a very rare prize among guitar shops and music stores.

The axe bass has also been associated with Marceline the Vampire Queen (character on the hit Cartoon Network television show Adventure Time), whose bass is very literally made out of a battle axe.

Origin 
Rock musician Gene Simmons is to be credited with the "axe" design. In 1978, Simmons was searching for a new bass guitar that would either "blend in" or "stand out from" his garish make up and costume, would be a good trademark, and would show his philosophy of how a bass should be handled - like a weapon. After garnering enough wealth from touring with his band Kiss, Simmons went to renowned luthier Steve Carr to build the first prototype of the axe bass and then the popular bass itself. Since then, the axe bass has been a running trademark for Kiss.

In 2012, Simmons commissioned Jim Cara of Original Cara Hot Rod Guitars to develop a chrome and gold plating process for the AXE and Punisher project. As of 2013, the Chrome models are available for purchase by high-end Kiss collectors.

External links
 www.genesimmonsaxe.com
 www.caraguitars.com

Electric bass guitars by manufacturer